On January 1, 1898, New York City absorbed East Bronx, Brooklyn, western Queens County, and Staten Island. For Brooklyn directories that are combined with Manhattan – before and after being incorporated with New York City – see New York City directories.

Brooklyn in the middle 19th century was a commercial rival of New York City.

Timeline, highlights, and creators

Brooklyn (Kings County) directories

Business directories: Brooklyn (Kings County)

Copartnership directories: Brooklyn and Queens

Brooklyn Chamber of Commerce

Elite directories: Brooklyn

Brooklyn street directories

Citizens and strangers' guides

Blue books

Almanacs

Telephone directories

Public schools

Charities, social services, and church directories

Maritime directories

Cemeteries

Brooklyn history

Brooklyn maps

State directories

Selected Brooklyn directories not found online 

 Hope & Henderson's

Map gallery

Citations

Notes

References 

  ; .
<li> 

<li> .
<li> .

 
 
  ; .
 
  .

 

<li> 
<li> 

  ; .

 

  (masthead is on )
 
 
   (article).

  .

 ; .

History of New York City
Directories
18th century in New York (state)
19th century in New York City
20th century in New York City
Books about New York City
History of Brooklyn
City directories